Capital punishment is a legal penalty for murder in Japan, and is applied in cases of multiple murder or aggravated single murder. Executions in Japan are carried out by hanging, and the country has seven execution chambers, all located in major cities.

After a four-year moratorium, executions resumed in 1993 and up to 15 have taken place almost each year since then. Thirteen of those executed in 2018, under former Minister of Justice and former think tank researcher Yōko Kamikawa, had taken part in the Tokyo subway sarin attack of 1995.

List of people executed
Names are transliterated in Western name order while the Japanese names are in its original form.

Note: Inmates noted with a * were sentenced to death for murder(s) committed while on parole for another murder

See also
Lists of people executed in the United States

References

Lists of executed people
Capital punishment in Japan